= Infraauricular deep parotid lymph nodes =

Infra-auricular deep parotid lymph nodes
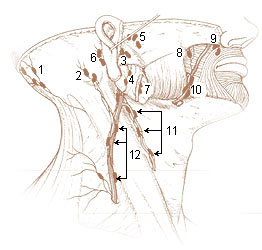
- 6. Infraauricular

Details
- System: Lymphatic system

Identifiers
- Latin: nodi lymphoidei parotidei profundi infraauriculares

The infra-auricular deep parotid lymph nodes are a group of lymph nodes found underneath the ear.
